The neutron flux, φ, is a scalar quantity used in nuclear physics and nuclear reactor physics. It is the total distance travelled by all free neutrons per unit time and volume. The usual unit is cm−2s−1 (neutrons per centimeter squared per second).

The neutron fluence is defined as the neutron flux integrated over a certain time period, so its usual unit is cm−2 (neutrons per centimeter squared). An older term used instead of cm−2 was n.v.t. (neutrons, velocity, time).

Natural neutron flux
Neutron flux in asymptotic giant branch stars and in supernovae is responsible for most of the natural nucleosynthesis producing elements heavier than iron. In stars there is a relatively low neutron flux on the order of 105 to 1011 cm−2 s−1, resulting in nucleosynthesis by the s-process (slow neutron-capture process). By contrast, after a core-collapse supernova, there is an extremely high neutron flux, on the order of 1032 cm−2 s−1, resulting in nucleosynthesis by the r-process (rapid neutron-capture process).

Earth atmospheric neutron flux, apparently from thunderstorms, can reach levels of 3·10−2 to 9·10+1 cm−2 s−1. However, recent results (considered invalid by the original investigators) obtained with unshielded scintillation neutron detectors show a decrease in the neutron flux during thunderstorms. Recent research appears to support lightning generating 1013–1015 neutrons per discharge via photonuclear processes.

Artificial neutron flux

Artificial neutron flux refers to neutron flux which is man-made, either as byproducts from weapons or nuclear energy production or for a specific application such as from a research reactor or by spallation. A flow of neutrons is often used to initiate the fission of unstable large nuclei. The additional neutron(s) may cause the nucleus to become unstable, causing it to decay (split) to form more stable products. This effect is essential in fission reactors and nuclear weapons.

Within a nuclear fission reactor, the neutron flux is the primary quantity measured to control the reaction inside. The flux shape is the term applied to the density or relative strength of the flux as it moves around the reactor. Typically the strongest neutron flux occurs in the middle of the reactor core, becoming lower toward the edges. The higher the neutron flux the greater the chance of a nuclear reaction occurring as there are more neutrons going through an area per unit time.

Reactor vessel wall neutron fluence 
A reactor vessel of a typical nuclear power plant (PWR) endures in 40 years (32 full reactor years) of operation approximately 6.5×1019 cm−2 (E > 1 MeV) of neutron fluence. Neutron flux causes reactor vessels to suffer from neutron embrittlement.

See also
Neutron radiation
Neutron transport

References

Flux